Richard Jewell may refer to:

 Richard Jewell (1962–2007), the man wrongly accused of the 1996 Olympic Park bombing in Atlanta
 Richard G. Jewell, 8th president of Grove City College
 Richard Roach Jewell (1810–1891), Australian architect
 Richard Jewell (film), a 2019 biographical film about the 1996 Olympic bombing